The 2018–19 Tweede Divisie season is the third edition of the Dutch third tier since on hiatus from 1970-71 season and the 18th edition using Tweede Divisie name. Thirteen teams competed from the last season along with one relegated team from the Eerste Divisie and four promoted teams from the Derde Divisie.

At an extraordinary KNVB federation meeting on 2 October 2017, representatives of the amateur and professional football reached an agreement about the route to be taken to renew the football pyramid. Part of this agreement was that no promotion/relegation will take place between the Eerste and Tweede Divisie for the current season.

At another extraordinary KNVB federation meeting on 7 June 2018, an agreement was reached about the number of reserves teams allowed in each division as of season 2019–20. For the Tweede Divisie it will be 2 teams. Since there are currently 3 reserve teams (Jong Almere, Jong Sparta and Jong Vitesse) in the Tweede Divisie, the reserve team which ends lowest of the three will relegate to the Derde Divisie. In case a reserve team becomes champion in one of the Derde Divisies, the second best reserve team in the Tweede divisie will relegate as well.

On 18 December 2018 FC Lienden withdrew from the competition due to financial difficulties. On 6 January 2019 FC Lienden succeeded in making a restart with the help of their manager Hans van de Haar. The club found a new sponsor and will start working together with two football academies to complement the first team for the second half of the season.

Teams

Standings

References 

Tweede Divisie seasons
3
Ned